Footage Missing is the sixth studio album by Mornington Peninsula, Melbourne, Australia  indie band The Fauves.

Cox said, "The concept was simply to go and make another good record. We didn't workshop too many fancy scenarios - it's not possible on our kind of budgets. We didn't really have any strong ideas about what style of record we were going to make. We wrote a large number of songs over a period of about a year which resulted in a wide variety of styles coming through."

Discussing the album title, Cox said, "as you get older someone may be relating a story from the past and suddenly there's a blank. That happens a lot with us when we are crapping on. Footage Missing refers to that blank spot in your memory. I don't know where it went."

Track listing
All songs by The Fauves
 "Insert Your Life"
 "Good Times Coming"
 "Yo-Yo Craze"
 "Ticket To The Big Time"
 "Unsafe At Any Speed"
 "One Of The Girls"
 "LA '86"
 "Nairobi Nights"
 "Wendy"
 "The Finest Choice"
 "Phasing You In"
 "Chaos And Dance"
 "Right-Wing Fags"

Personnel

 Andrew Cox - guitar, vocals
 Philip Leonard - guitar, vocals
 Adam Newey - drums, vocals
 Timothy Cleaver - bass, vocals

References

The Fauves albums
2002 albums